Jeremy Greaves is an Australian bishop in the Anglican Church of Australia. He has served as the Assistant Bishop of Brisbane (Northern Region) since 2017.

Greaves' grandfather, Walter Baddeley, was Bishop of Melanesia, based in the Solomon Islands, during World War II.

Greaves was ordained deacon in 1997 and priest in 1998. Following his ordination he served in a number of roles including in Ceduna in South Australia and Katherine in the Northern Territory, as Dean of Christ Church Cathedral, Darwin from 2007 to 2013, and immediately prior to his appointment, as rector of St Mark's Anglican Church in Buderim and Archdeacon of the Sunshine Coast.

In November 2016, Greaves was appointed as Bishop of the Northern Region in the Diocese of Brisbane and was consecrated as bishop and installed in that role on 24 February 2017.

Greaves has described himself as a "progressive" Christian who "live[s] on the edge of the church". In 2010, he told ABC Radio National that he would be "happy to abandon" the Apostles' Creed. In 2013, while a priest, Greaves expressed that Christians were ready to embrace same-sex marriage, and found it curious he could bless pets but not same-sex couples.

Greaves is married to Josie and has three children.

References

21st-century Anglican bishops in Australia
Assistant bishops in the Anglican Diocese of Brisbane
Deans of Darwin
Living people
Year of birth missing (living people)